Ledce is name of several places in the Czech Republic:

Ledce (Brno-Country District), a municipality and village in the South Moravian Region
Ledce (Hradec Králové District), a municipality and village in the Hradec Králové Region
Ledce (Kladno District), a municipality and village in the Central Bohemian Region
Ledce (Mladá Boleslav District), a municipality and village in the Central Bohemian Region
Ledce (Plzeň-North District), a municipality and village in the Plzeň Region
Ledce, a village and administrative part of Kadlín in the Central Bohemian Region
Ledce, a village and administrative part of Nespeky in the Central Bohemian Region